Koyapalli Kelappan (24 August 1889 – 7 October 1971) was an Indian politician, independence activist, educationist and journalist. During the Indian independence movement, he was the lead figure of Indian National Congress in Kerala and was popularly known as Kerala Gandhi. After Indian independence, he held various seats in Gandhian organizations. He is the founding member and president of the Nair Service Society and was also the founder of Kerala Kshetra Samrakshana Samiti (Temple Protection Movement).

Early life
Kelappan was born in the small village of Muchukunnu at Koyilandy  in Calicut, Kerala. His father's name is Kanaran Nair and mother's name is Kunjamma Amma.

He studied in Calicut and Madras and graduated from the University of Madras before starting his career as a teacher at St. Berchmans High School, Changanassery. Kelappan was the founding President of the Nair Service Society and later became the principal of a school run by the society.

As reformer
He fought for social reforms on one hand and the British on the other. He fought relentlessly against untouchability and caste-based discrimination. Along with K. Kumar, he became the earliest in Kerala to remove the suffix to his name that implied caste-status. He was called Kerala Gandhi.

Kelappan laboured incessantly for the equality of all sections of the people. He was a major influence on the Vaikom Satyagraha movement and later led the Guruvayur Satyagraha in 1932. During Gandhi's visit to Travancore to commemorate the Temple Entry Proclamation, he seconded the most critical resolution re-establishing faith in Gandhiji's leadership and the forward steps to be taken in conformity with the Gandhian approach to translate the spirit of the move for social equality. The resolution was presented by K. Kumar of Travancore, a veteran reformer and one of the leaders of the Vaikom Satyagraha who later came to be forgotten by people and historians.

Role post independence
After independence he left the Congress Party and joined the Kisan Mazdoor Praja Party and was elected to Parliament from the Ponnani Lok Sabha seat in 1952. At the end of his term, he left active politics and became a Sarvodaya worker and was actively associated with Bhoodan Movement in Kerala.

Kelappan helped in starting Mathrubhoomi and was its editor for a number of years. He worked for unification of Kerala into a new linguistic state. He was also the president of many Gandhian organizations in Kerala including Kerala Sarvodaya Sangh, Kerala Gandhi Smarak Nidhi, Kerala Sarvodaya Mandal and Gandhi Peace Foundation, Calicut.

Some of his political interventions towards the end of his life had been criticised for their communal tinge. These include his opposition to the formation of Muslim-majority Malappuram District in Kerala arguing that it will create a 'mini Pakistan', and his involvement in a temple resurrection near a Mosque in Angadippuram, in Malapppuram leading to communal tensions.

His last big involvement was in the 'Tali Temple Movement'. Locals at Angadippuram in Malappuram who were trying to peacefully rebuild a Hindu Temple destroyed by Tipu's forces in 18th century were harassed by extremist religious elements, asserting that a Mosque was nearby the destroyed site. Then Left Government was also apathetic to the local Hindu cause. Kelappan himself entered into the struggle and led a 'Satygaraha' for the reconstruction of the Temple. Despite several attempts by the Government and police to stop the protests, Kelappan's satyagaraha won and the Hindus were allowed to build their temple. But before its completion, K.Kelappan died on  October 7, 1971. The Temple built with his support stands alongside the Mosque, symbolizing the present harmony among different communities.

Awards and recognition
In his honour India Post released a Commemorative stamp in 1990.

References

1889 births
1971 deaths
India MPs 1952–1957
Gandhians
Indian civil rights activists
Indian independence activists from Kerala
Indian National Congress politicians from Kerala
Lok Sabha members from Kerala
Malayali politicians
People from Kozhikode district
University of Madras alumni